Grady County is a county located in the U.S. state of Oklahoma. As of the 2010 census, the population was 52,431. Its county seat is Chickasha. It was named for Henry W. Grady, an editor of the Atlanta Constitution and southern orator.

Grady County is part of the Oklahoma City, OK Metropolitan Statistical Area.

History
Grady County was part of the land given to the Choctaw by the Treaty of Dancing Rabbit Creek, in exchange for property in the southeastern United States. In 1837, the Chickasaw joined the Choctaws, and in 1855 a treaty separated the two tribes, and the Chickasaw acquired an area that included much of Grady County.  Most of the present Grady County became a part of Pickens County in the Chickasaw Nation.

Before the Civil War, Randolph B. Marcy blazed the California Road through this area, reporting a Waco and a Wichita village. In 1858, while the Comanches were holding a meeting with the Wichita, Choctaw, and Chickasaw, Federal troops attacked a party of Comanches. Although the commander of Fort Arbuckle had been informed about the meeting, the troops' commander, Major Earl Van Dorn, had not consulted him before the attack. As a result, the troops killed 60 Comanches and four Wichitas. Fearing a Comanche reprisal, the other tribes fled to safety at Fort Arbuckle. At the end of the Civil War, the Five Civilized Tribes and the Caddo, Delaware, Kiowa, Comanche, Apache, Cheyenne, Arapaho, and Osage signed a peace agreement and pledged to stand united against any unjust demands that the federal government made at the war's end. The agreement was known as the Camp Napoleon Compact.

The first railroad in this area was built to the town of Minco in 1890 by the Chicago, Kansas and Nebraska Railway.  The company was acquired by the Chicago, Rock Island and Pacific Railroad (Rock Island) during the following year. In 1892, the Rock Island built a track connecting Chickasha, Ninnekah, and Rush Springs to the Texas border. The same railroad built a line from Chickasha to Mangum in 1900. The Oklahoma City and Western Railroad (sold to the St. Louis and San Francisco Railway in 1907) constructed tracks from Oklahoma City to Chickasha, which it extended to the Texas border in the following year. Between 1906 and 1910, the Oklahoma Central Railway (sold to the Atchison, Topeka and Santa Fe Railway in 1914) built from Lehigh to Chickasha.

The 1898 Curtis Act stripped the Chickasaw Nation of its authority, and communal land was forced into allotment, paving the way for statehood.  When Oklahoma acquired statehood in 1907, the Chickasaw Nation ceased to exist, Grady County was organized and Chickasha was named the county seat. In 1911, Grady County annexed Washington, Prairie Valley, and the northern section of Dutton townships formerly in Caddo County, Oklahoma.

Geography
The county lies in the Red Bed Plains, and is mostly covered with rolling prairie. The Canadian River forms the northern boundary and the Washita River runs through the middle.

Major highways

  Interstate 44
  H.E. Bailey Turnpike
  U.S. Highway 62
  U.S. Highway 81
  U.S. Highway 277
  State Highway 9
  State Highway 17
  State Highway 19
  State Highway 92

Adjacent counties
 Canadian County (north)
 McClain County (east)
 Garvin County (southeast)
 Stephens County (south)
 Comanche County (southwest)
 Caddo County (west)

Demographics

As of the census of 2000, there were 45,516 people, 17,341 households, and 12,797 families residing in the county.  The population density was 41 people per square mile (16/km2).  There were 19,444 housing units at an average density of 18 per square mile (7/km2).  The racial makeup of the county was 87.31% White, 3.06% Black or (United States Census), 4.85% Native American, 0.34% Asians, 0.04% Pacific Islander, 1.12% from other races, and 3.28% from two or more races.  2.89% of the population were Hispanic or Latino of any race.

There were 17,341 households, out of which 34.70% had children under the age of 18 living with them, 60.50% were married couples living together, 9.70% had a female householder with no husband present, and 26.20% were non-families. 22.90% of all households were made up of individuals, and 10.50% had someone living alone who was 65 years of age or older.  The average household size was 2.58 and the average family size was 3.02.

In the county, the population was spread out, with 26.70% under the age of 18, 9.30% from 18 to 24, 27.70% from 25 to 44, 23.20% from 45 to 64, and 13.10% who were 65 years of age or older.  The median age was 36 years. For every 100 females, there were 95.30 males.  For every 100 females age 18 and over, there were 91.30 males.

The median income for a household in the county was $32,625, and the median income for a family was $39,636. Males had a median income of $30,306 versus $21,108 for females. The per capita income for the county was $15,846.  About 10.40% of families and 13.90% of the population were below the poverty line, including 16.90% of those under age 18 and 14.60% of those age 65 or over.

Politics

Communities

 Agawam
 Alex
 Amber
 Bradley
 Blanchard
 Bridge Creek
 Chickasha (county seat)
 Cox City
 Middleberg
 Minco
 Ninnekah
 Norge
 Pocasset
 Rush Springs
 Tabler
 Tuttle
 Verden

NRHP sites

The following sites in Grady County are listed on the National Register of Historic Places:
 Chickasha Downtown Historic District, Chickasha
 Grady County Courthouse, Chickasha
 Griffin House, Chickasha
 Jewett Site, Bradley
 Knippelmeir Farmstead, Minco vicinity
 Minco Armory, Minco
 New Hope Baptist Church, Chickasha
 Oklahoma College for Women Historic District, Chickasha
 Pocasset Gymnasium, Pocasset
 Rock Island Depot, Chickasha
 Silver City Cemetery, Tuttle
 US Post Office and Federal Courthouse, Chickasha
 Verden Separate School, originally in Verden but relocated to Chickasha

References

Further reading

External links
 Encyclopedia of Oklahoma History and Culture - Grady County
 Oklahoma Digital Maps: Digital Collections of Oklahoma and Indian Territory

 
Oklahoma City metropolitan area
1907 establishments in Oklahoma
Populated places established in 1907